Oscar Fritschi (25 February 1939 – 8 January 2016) was a Swiss politician (FDP).

Fritschi grew up as the son of a liberal Superintendent of the textile industry on in Winterthur, Switzerland. He completed a history degree at the University of Zurich and received a doctorate. He subsequently worked as a high school teacher and wrote reports of party meetings for the Neue Zürcher Zeitung (NZZ).

In 1965, Fritschi was appointed by the then cantonal party president and editor of the NZZ Ernst Bieri to party secretary for the canton and city of Zurich. In 1972, Fritschi became editor in chief for the Zurich Oberland.

From 1986 to 1992, Fritschi was president of the FDP of the Canton of Zurich. From 1991 to 1992, he was a member of the Cantonal Council of the Canton of Zurich. On November 25, 1991, he was in the National Assembly elected and had there a seat in the Security Policy, the Political Institutions and the Drafting Committee. In the 1999 parliamentary elections, he no longer had support, and therefore resigned December 5, 1999, the Grand Chamber of. After that, he was president of the European Conference on Human Rights and self-determination.

Fritschi retired in 2004, but remained Chairman of the Board of the scoreboard of Uster, and worked for Journal of Zurich Oberlander. He was also appointed to the board of the FDP of the district Hinwil and president of the Foundation for Archaeology and Cultural History in Canton Zurich.

In the Swiss army, Fritschi was a Colonel. He never married.

Fritschi died on 8 January 2016, following a short stay in a hospital.

References

Free Democratic Party of Switzerland politicians
1939 births

2016 deaths